Tanna sozanensis is an insect, a species of cicada of the genus Tanna.

References 

Tanna (genus)
Hemiptera of Asia